Mineral Fork is a stream in Washington County, Missouri. It is a tributary of the Big River.

Mineral Fork was so named on account of deposits of the lead ore minerals near its course.

See also
List of rivers of Missouri

References

Rivers of Washington County, Missouri
Rivers of Missouri